Frederik Beyer Tingager (born 22 February 1993) is a Danish professional footballer who plays as a defender for Danish Superliga club AGF.

Career

Early career
Born in Tuse, Holbæk Municipality, Tingager began his career at Tuse IF and eventually joined the Brøndby IF academy after spending a few years in the youth department of Holbæk B&I. In January 2012, Tingager returned to Holbæk, to play for their first team competing in the third division.

OB
In January 2016, Tingager joined Danish Superliga club OB after a successful trial. He made his professional debut on 8 May 2016, when OB lost 1–0 to FC Copenhagen. He came to six appearances and one goal that season, as OB finished seventh in the league table. In the 2016–17 season, the club also managed to avoid relegation.

Eintracht Braunschweig
In January 2018, Tingager moved to Eintracht Braunschweig in Germany. He made 14 appearances and one goal in his first season. The club suffered relegation at the end of the season from the 2. Bundesliga. On 29 December 2018, his contract, which ran until June 2020, was terminated at the end of the year; the team had been in the relegation zone of the 3. Liga since the third matchday.

AGF
In January 2019, days after agreeing the termination of his contract with Eintracht Braunschweig, Tingager returned to Denmark signing with AGF.

References

External links
 

1993 births
Living people
Danish men's footballers
Danish expatriate men's footballers
Danish expatriate sportspeople in Germany
Expatriate footballers in Germany
Association football defenders
Holbæk B&I players
Brøndby IF players
Odense Boldklub players
Eintracht Braunschweig players
Aarhus Gymnastikforening players
Danish Superliga players
2. Bundesliga players
3. Liga players
People from Holbæk Municipality
Sportspeople from Region Zealand